The Right Hon. Andrew Rutherfurd, Lord Rutherfurd,  (born Andrew Greenfield; 21 June 1791 – 13 December 1854) was a Scottish advocate, judge and politician.

Early life

Rutherfurd was born at Bristo Port (near Greyfriars Kirkyard) in Edinburgh on 21 June 1791 to Janet Rutherfurd Bervie, and Reverend William Greenfield. In 1799, after his father was disgraced in a sex scandal, the family changed their name to Rutherfurd, his maternal grandmother's maiden name. His main house was Lauriston Castle near Cramond just north-west of the city. His sister married John Gordon FRSE, father of John Thomson Gordon FRSE.

He was educated at the High School in Edinburgh then studied law at the University of Edinburgh. He became an advocate in 1812.

Career
In the 1830s he is listed as an advocate living at 9, St Colme Street, on the Moray Estate in Edinburgh's west end. His house was remodelled by William Notman in 1835, whilst working in the offices of William Henry Playfair.

He was appointed Solicitor General for Scotland from 1837, becoming Lord Advocate in 1839 and Member of Parliament for Leith burghs in the same year. He resigned office in September 1841 on William Peel's accession to power. He was appointed Rector of the University of Glasgow in 1844.

He played an active part in parliamentary proceedings relating to Scotland, and proposed the repeal of the Corn Laws in 1846. He was reappointed Lord Advocate in 1846, and was responsible for legislation amending the law of entail in Scotland in 1848. He served on the Royal Commission on the British Museum (1847–49).

On 2 January 1849 he was elected a Fellow of the Royal Society of Edinburgh, his proposer being John Russell.

He was appointed a Senator of the College of Justice, as Lord Rutherfurd and a Privy Counsellor in May 1851. From 1851 to 1854 he was a Lord of Session.

Personal life
In 1822, Rutherfurd married Sophia Frances Stewart, one of three daughters and two sons born to  Mary Susanna ( Whaley) Stewart (a daughter of Richard Chapell Whaley, MP of Whaley Abbey) and Sir James Stewart, 7th Baronet, MP for Donegal. They had no children.

His wife died in 1852 and was buried with him. He died on 13 December 1854 at 9 St Colme Street, his Edinburgh townhouse. He is buried at Dean Cemetery in western Edinburgh.

Legacy
At Dean Cemetery, he was buried on Lord's Row, against the western wall, beneath a red granite pyramid designed by William Henry Playfair and built by Stewart McGlashan. The monument is inscribed: Uxori desideratissimae contra votum superstes moerens posuit Andreas Rutherfurd, et sibi, MDCCCLII. ("Andrew Rutherfurd, surviving against his will, placed this tomb in mourning to his most beloved wife, and to himself, 1852".)

Galley

References

External links 
 

1791 births
1854 deaths
Rutherfurd
Members of the Parliament of the United Kingdom for Edinburgh constituencies
Members of the Faculty of Advocates
Members of the Privy Council of the United Kingdom
UK MPs 1837–1841
UK MPs 1841–1847
UK MPs 1847–1852
People associated with the British Museum
Burials at the Dean Cemetery
Fellows of the Royal Society of Edinburgh
People educated at the Royal High School, Edinburgh
Alumni of the University of Edinburgh
Solicitors General for Scotland
Lord Advocates
Politics of Edinburgh
Rectors of the University of Glasgow
Scottish Liberal Party MPs